This is the discography of American rapper U-God.

Discography

Studio albums

Other

Singles

Guest appearances

References

External links 

 

Hip hop discographies
Discographies of American artists